Nagarjuna Sagar Assembly constituency is a constituency of the Telangana Legislative Assembly, India. It is one of 12 constituencies in the Nalgonda district. It is part of Nalgonda Lok Sabha constituency.

Mandals
After the recent delimitation, Nagarjuna Sagar Assembly Constituency comprises the following Mandals: Nidamanoor, Gurrampode, Peddavoora, Anumula, Tripuraram and Thirumalagiri Sagar.

Members of Legislative Assembly

Election results

Bypoll 2021

Telangana Legislative Assembly election, 2018

Telangana Legislative Assembly election, 2014

See also
 List of constituencies of Telangana Legislative Assembly
 Nagarjuna Sagar

References

Assembly constituencies of Telangana
Assembly constituencies of Nalgonda district